Ana Carolina de Jesus Azevedo (born 19 May 1998) is a Brazilian sprinter.

In 2020, Azevedo was named Best Female Athlete by the Brazilian Athletics Confederation. Azevedo completed in the 200 metres at the 2020 Summer Olympics, where she ran a time of 23.20 sec in her qualifying heat.

References

External links

1998 births
Living people
Athletes (track and field) at the 2020 Summer Olympics
Olympic athletes of Brazil
Brazilian female sprinters
20th-century Brazilian women
21st-century Brazilian women
People from São Roque, São Paulo